Butler County is a county located in the US state of Kentucky. As of the 2020 Census, the population was 12,371. Its county seat is Morgantown. The county was formed in 1810, becoming Kentucky's 53rd county. Butler County is included in the Bowling Green, Kentucky, Metropolitan Statistical Area.

History
Numerous archaeological sites are located along the Green River in Butler County.  A 1932 survey found nine sites, many of which were a group of shell mounds, including the Carlston Annis and DeWeese Shell Mounds.

The area now known as Butler County was first settled by the families of Richard C. Dellium and James Forgy, who founded a town called Berry's Lick. The first industry was salt-making.

On January 18, 1810, the Kentucky General Assembly created Butler County from portions of Logan and Ohio counties. The new county was named for Major General Richard Butler, who died at the Battle of the Wabash in 1791. In June of that year, the Kentucky Governor commissioned a study to locate a county seat. They selected a two-acre tract belonging to Christopher Funkhouser. This site, at first called Funkhouser Hill, was later named Morgantown. The county site has remained at that site until present times.

In 1833 a navigation plan for the Green River was initiated. As one result of this plan, a town (Rochester) was founded at Lock/Dam #3, and another (Woodbury) at Lock/Dam #4.

The American Civil War in 1861 slowed the county's growth. The county was site of a few incidents during the conflict. There was a fight near Morgantown on October 29, 1861, and a skirmish on October 30 where the rebels were encamped. In the latter part of the nineteenth century, veterans from both sides raised funds to raise a monument at the courthouse. It lists county residents who fought in the war on both sides. This is one of only two Civil War monuments in Kentucky that honor the soldiers of both sides. The Confederate-Union Veterans' Monument in Morgantown, a zinc monument, was dedicated in 1907 on the Butler County Courthouse lawn.

Geography
It is part of the Western Coal Fields region of Kentucky.

Adjacent counties
 Ohio County  (northwest)
 Grayson County  (northeast)
 Edmonson County  (east)
 Warren County  (southeast)
 Logan County  (south)
 Muhlenberg County  (west)

Demographics

As of the census of 2000, there were 13,010 people, 5,059 households, and 3,708 families residing in the county. The racial makeup of the county was 97.88% White, 0.52% Black or African American, 0.22% Native American, 0.17% Asian, 0.60% from other races, and 0.61% from two or more races. 1.04% of the population were Hispanic or Latino of any race.

There were 5,059 households, out of which 34.40% had children under the age of 18 living with them, 60.30% were married couples living together, 9.30% had a female householder with no husband present, and 26.70% were non-families. 23.70% of all households were made up of individuals, and 10.30% had someone living alone who was 65 years of age or older.  The average household size was 2.52 and the average family size was 2.98.

The county population contained 25.30% under the age of 18, 9.50% from 18 to 24, 29.20% from 25 to 44, 23.20% from 45 to 64, and 12.80% who were 65 years of age or older. The median age was 36 years. For every 100 females there were 99.00 males. For every 100 females age 18 and over, there were 96.20 males.

The median income for a household in the county was $29,405, and the median income for a family was $35,317. Males had a median income of $26,449 versus $19,894 for females. The per capita income for the county was $14,617.  About 13.10% of families and 16.00% of the population were below the poverty line, including 18.50% of those under age 18 and 22.50% of those age 65 or over.

Communities

Cities
 Morgantown (county seat)
 Rochester
 Woodbury

Unincorporated communities

 Aberdeen
 Brooklyn
 Davis Crossroads
 Dexterville
 Dunbar
 Gilstrap
 Huldeville
 Huntsville
 Jetson
 Logansport
 Mining City
 Monford
 Needmore
 Provo
 Quality
 Reedyville
 Roundhill (partly in Edmonson County)
 Silver City
 South Hill
 Sugar Grove
 Welch's (or Welchs) Creek
 Welcome
 Whittinghill
 Youngtown

Politics
Like the central Pennyroyal Plateau, but unlike the Jackson Purchase or Barren and Simpson Counties, Butler County was strongly pro-Union during the American Civil War due to its broken, sandy terrain unfavourable for plantation agriculture, although its actual level of Union volunteering was lower than more easterly Pennyroyal counties. Consequently, Butler County has remained rock-ribbed Republican through the post-Civil War era; the last Democrat to carry the county was George B. McClellan in 1864, and the only Democrat to win forty percent of the county's vote since at least 1896 has been Franklin D. Roosevelt in 1932.

Transportation
For much of its history, Butler County's main line of transportation was the Green River. As railroads became more important economically, the county compensated by building a series of roads to major trade centers such as U.S. 231 connecting Beaver Dam with Owensboro. Green River was eventually closed to traffic after Woodbury's Lock and Dam Number 4 washed out in 1965 and Rochester's Lock and Dam Number 3 was abandoned by the United States Army Corps of Engineers in 1980. Completion of the William H. Natcher Parkway (now I-165) linked the area to the national interstate system in 1970.

Media

Radio and television
Butler County is part of the Bowling Green radio and television markets, and is served by that city's radio and TV outlets. Mediacom is the primary cable television and internet provider serving the county.

Local radio stations 
 WLBQ-AM 1570 / W268CE FM 101.5 / W278DA FM 103.5 
 WWKN-FM 99.1

Newspaper
 Butler County Banner-Republican - published Wednesdays

Online news site
 BeechTree News

Sites and events of interest
 Charles Black City Park - Helm Lane off Kentucky Route 70, Morgantown. Baseball and soccer fields, basketball and tennis courts; free access (the Morgantown City Swimming Pool has an admission fee).    
 Cedar Ridge Speedway, two miles west of Morgantown along KY 70, is a venue for local racing leagues. 
 Green River Museum, Woodbury
 The Corner Market in Roundhill, Junction of State routes 70 and 185 on the Butler-Edmonson County line.
 Big Reedy Christian Camp, D Simpson Road off KY 185, Reedyville.
Events include:
 Green River Catfish Festival (annual event) - Charles Black City Park and various locations; late June/early July Features a carnival, various contests, concerts, and tournaments. A fireworks display on July 4 is also included.

Notable people
 Claude C. Bloch (b. 1878 in Woodbury, d. 1967) – Admiral who commanded the local Naval District at Pearl Harbor at the time of the Japanese attack in 1941.
 Keith Butler – baseball pitcher, St. Louis Cardinals (from Morgantown).
 Thomas Hines – Confederate spy during the Civil War, later a chief justice of the Kentucky Court of Appeals
 Don J. Jenkins – Vietnam War soldier and Medal of Honor recipient (born in Quality)
 John M. Moore – bishop of the Methodist Episcopal Church, South (born in Morgantown)
 William S. Taylor – Governor of Kentucky 1899–1900 (born near Morgantown)
 Pendleton Vandiver – fiddler and uncle of bluegrass musician Bill Monroe, who immortalized him in the song "Uncle Pen" and in the Country Boy music video for Ricky Skaggs
 Maurice Thatcher – Assistant Attorney General of Kentucky, Governor of Panama, and U.S. Representative.

See also

 Dry counties
 National Register of Historic Places listings in Butler County, Kentucky

References

External links
 

 
1810 establishments in Kentucky
Populated places established in 1810
Kentucky counties